Gorodishche is a rural locality (a selo) in Solikamsky District, Perm Krai, Russia. The population was 898 as of 2010. There are 18 streets.

Geography 
Gorodishche is located 8 km northeast of Solikamsk (the district's administrative centre) by road. Maloye Gorodishche is the nearest rural locality.

References 

Rural localities in Solikamsky District